Brooks is an unincorporated community located, in the town of New Chester, Adams County, Wisconsin, United States.

The community was originally named Brookings, but shortened its name at the Chicago and North Western Railway's request. It once had a post office, which opened in 1915.

References

Unincorporated communities in Adams County, Wisconsin
Unincorporated communities in Wisconsin